Felice Cappelletti (1656–1738) was an Italian painter of the Late-Baroque, active in mainly in Verona.

He was born and trained in Verona under Santo Prunati. He contributed paintings to the churches of Santa Caterina presso Ognissanti, Sant’Anastasia, and Santi Apollonia e Margherita in Verona. Many works were lost during the French occupation of Verona.

Works
Christ washing feet of Apostles, Oratory of San Simone Apostolo, Verona
Rescue of St Peter, Parish church of Santi Pietro e Paolo, Torri del Benaco
Angel destroys Idols, Parish church of Santi Pietro e Paolo, Torri del Benaco
Dream of Saint Joseph, Accademia di Belle Arti Tadini, Lovere

References

1656 births
1738 deaths
17th-century Italian painters
Italian male painters
18th-century Italian painters
Italian Baroque painters
Painters from Verona
18th-century Italian male artists